Colonel Aylmer Spicer Cameron,  (12 August 1833 – 10 June 1909), born in Perth, was a British soldier and recipient of the Victoria Cross, the highest and most prestigious award for gallantry in the face of the enemy that can be awarded to British and Commonwealth forces.

Life
Cameron was born on 12 August 1833 into a military family. He was the son of Colonel William Gordon Cameron, Grenadier Guards, and grandson of General William Neville Cameron of the East India Company's service. He had four brothers in the Army and Navy, including General Sir William Gordon Cameron. Four of his five sons served in the armed forces, including Major Cecil Aylmer Cameron.  
His daughter, Esme Gordon, married Vice Admiral Joseph Charles Walrond Henley, CB.

Aylmer Cameron was commissioned as an Ensign in the 72nd Highlanders, British Army, on 9 July 1852, and promoted to Lieutenant in August 1854. He took part in the Crimean War and was present at the siege of Sebastopol in 1855, before going to India after the outbreak of the Indian Mutiny in 1857.

VC action
Cameron was 24 years old, and a lieutenant in the 72nd Highlanders during the Indian Mutiny when the following deed took place on 30 March 1858 at Kotah, India for which he was awarded the VC:

In addition to receiving the VC, for his services in India Cameron was twice mentioned in dispatches and, in December 1859, was promoted to captain.

Later service
In June 1871 Cameron was promoted to major in the King’s Own Scottish Borderers (25th Foot), becoming a lieutenant-colonel in October 1877 and colonel in July 1881. He served as a staff officer in Canada from 1879 to 1881, and commanded the 2nd Battalion King’s Own Scottish Borderers from July 1881 to 1883. He was chief of the Intelligence Branch at Army Headquarters from 1883 to 1886, and Commandant of the Royal Military College, Sandhurst from 1886 to 1888. He was made a Companion of the Order of the Bath in May 1886, and retired in August 1888. 

He died, after a long period of ill-health, on	10 June 1909 aged 75,  and is buried in St Mark's Churchyard, Highcliffe, Dorset.

The medal
His Victoria Cross is displayed at the Regimental Museum of Queens Own Highlanders in Fort George, Highland, Scotland.

References

External links
Location of grave (Dorset) and VC medal (Fort George) 
British Medals (Biography)

 

Indian Rebellion of 1857 recipients of the Victoria Cross
72nd Highlanders officers
British recipients of the Victoria Cross
Companions of the Order of the Bath
1833 births
Burials in Dorset
1909 deaths
British Army personnel of the Crimean War
King's Own Scottish Borderers officers
Commandants of Sandhurst
Military personnel from Perth, Scotland
British Army recipients of the Victoria Cross